Baía da Parda is a small bay on the east coast of the island of Sal, Cape Verde. It lies about 3 km south of Pedra de Lume, and 5 km southeast of the island capital Espargos. It is known for its reefs, which are frequented by sharks.

References

Bays of Cape Verde
Geography of Sal, Cape Verde